Gubelmann is a surname. Notable people with the surname include:

 Fiona Gubelmann (born 1980), American actress
 Marjorie Gubelmann (born 1969), CEO of Vie Luxe International
 William S. Gubelmann (1863–1959), American inventor

See also
 Gabelmann